Urkiye Mine Balman (January 29, 1927 - April 28, 2018), born in Lefke, was a Turkish Cypriot author and poet who graduated from the Cyprus Turkish Teachers' Training College in 1946 and worked as a teacher in Cyprus.

Balman has written on a wide variety of genres, but her works are mostly romantic poems describing sometimes a lonesome village girl or country life and long-distance romances.
Balman has published her works in Yeşilada, Türk Dili, and Türk'e Doğru literary magazines in Turkey.
Some of her poems have also been set to music by Turkish Cypriot musicians.

Works
"Urkiye Mine Balman", Sevgisiir
"Köy Düğünü" (Village Wedding) Gulum.net
 Yurduma Giden Yollar ("The Roads that Lead to My Home") 1952
 Kibris Turk Yazininin Ilk Kadin Sairlerinden URKIYE MINE BALMAN 2003

References

1927 births
2018 deaths
People from Nicosia District
Turkish Cypriot poets
Turkish Cypriot women